3D Aerobatics or 3D flying is a form of flying using flying aircraft to perform specific aerial maneuvers. They are usually performed when the aircraft had been intentionally placed in a stalled position.

Introduction 
In its most basic sense, 3D flight is controlled flight beyond the stalls critical angle of attack (AoA, or alpha) aka post-stall. Because the model is stalled and has little natural airflow across its flight surfaces, most 3D maneuvers require very large control deflections to vector the propeller thrust and change the models attitude.

3D aerobatic flying is a typically performed by model aircraft which have been configured  with a higher thrust-to-weight ratio of more than 1:1. In fixed wing aeroplanes large control surfaces assist the aircraft on performing radical maneuvers which allow the aircraft to turn in tighter than conventional turns. This is achieved by having larger control surfaces; rudder, ailerons, and elevator and having greater amounts of throw applied to these control surfaces.

Depending on the type of competition, a pilot may compete in Set Manoeuvres where a pilot can choose from a number of manoeuvres from pre-published set of moves or Freestyle, where pilots must show their skill within a predetermined environment in a free format. The Extreme Flight Championships (XFC) is a large international freestyle competition.

Pilots often train moves using PC simulators such as RealFlight  or other RC flight simulators. This allows the pilot to practice and hone their skills before using the real RC model which may be costly exercise in the event of a crash. Pilots have the ability to plug the controller used to fly the real model to the PC and simulator via a USB link cable thus giving the pilot a better response to the real world controls. Famous pilots include Quique Somenzini, Andrew Jesky, Jason Noll, Frank Noll, Chip Hyde, Mark Leseberg and Gernot Bruckmann.

Source: www.aircraft-hobby.com
Source:

Types of aircraft

Aeroplanes 
There are a multitude of Hobby Grade Model Airframes that can perform 3D manoeuvres. Many of these models are designed after full scale airframes with slight modifications to accommodate thrust to weight ratios, control surface sizes.
Some of the most popular scale models are below:

Extra Aircraft:
Extra 260
Extra 300
Extra 330S

Zivko:
Edge 540

Yakovlev (Also known as Yak):
Yak-54
Yak-55

Sukhoi:
Su-26
Su-29

Cap Aviation:
CAP 230

AkroTechs
Giles G-202

There are also custom made 3D capable aircraft that are not modeled after full scale aircraft.

For instance:
Showtime 50,
Showtime 4D,
GP Reactor,
Twist 40 and Twist 60 3D,
Thunder 3D,
Slick 580,
and Laser.

Some of the popular aerobatic model manufacturers include Extreme Flight RC, 3D Hobby Shop, JTA Innovations, Flex Innovations, Composite ARF, Hangar 9, Krill, and others.

Helicopters 
3D Helicopters are collective pitch and have very high head speeds and they range in size from a few inch blades to over 2 foot long blades. Some of the most popular sizes are 250, 300, 450, 500, 550, 600, 700.

Aeroplane Manoeuvres 

Hover    You pull the aircraft into a completely vertical attitude and allow the propeller to hold the aeroplane in the air in plane much like a helicopter. This is the most basic 3D manoeuvre and usually the first one new modelers want to learn

Torque Roll The plane is made to hover in place, rotating around its roll axis. This is an extension of a Hover whereas the Torque of the engine rolls the aeroplane.

Elevator The aircraft is stalled with a large amount of elevator up or down. This causes the plane to descend vertically.

Wall The Wall is where the aeroplane is made to come to a stalled stop to a vertical position from a previous horizontal flight path, usually this is executed prior a Hover.

Alien Wall The same as a Wall but pulled into full vertical position violently at high speed.

Harrier  A very slow forward flight motion with the nose high at about 45 degrees of attitude.

Inverted Harrier The same as the above, just inverted. Most capable pilots find this easier than a standard harrier due to the wing being above the center of gravity rather than below it.

Harrier Roll Like the Harrier manoeuvre but with a roll performed simultaneously.

Flat spin
A spin induced with full up elevator, full rudder, and full aileron. Once the spin is initiated you will level the ailerons and increase engine speed a bit to pull the aircraft around. This will in turn flatten the spin.

Inverted Flat spin
The same as the above but inverted. Inverted flat spins are easier to control, but can be hard to come out of due to orientation, and knowing when to stop the spin. When entering an inverted flat spin, you must apply opposite aileron to which the rudder is going. Once the spin is initiated, you do the same as a standard Flat Spin.

Waterfall The waterfall is a move where the plane is made to pivot 360 degrees in the pitch axes. Ideally this is performed with little altitude gain or forward motion.

Blender
Form of entering an inverted flat spin from a nose down attitude. The pilot applies full aileron, then rudder in the opposite direction and full down elevator. The plane will "snap" and then the pilot must neutralize aileron (and in some cases apply aileron in the same direction as the rudder) and the plane will be in an inverted flat spin.

Pop-Top
Same as a blender, but going up. The pilot must have a good deal of speed on an upline, then apply full aileron followed by opposite rudder and full down elevator (very similar to the blender). Then neutralize aileron and lessen elevator and the plane will spin while motionless in the air. This manoeuvre has a large "wow factor" because the plane is literally stopped dead in the air for a second or two.

Turn-Around
A Turn-Around is a figure to go from upright to inverted and opposite. To go from upright: go straight up make a quarter roll Cut your throttle and apply full rudder and down elevator. That all has to come in a special timing at the same time with your throttle management. To go from inverted is the same but opposite rudder. After that your plane should go opposite way in a down elevator.

Crankshaft
description comes...

Pin-Wheel
description comes...

Rifle-Roll
description comes...

Weeble-Wobble
description comes... 

High Alpha Knife Edge
description comes...

Knife Edge Spin
description comes...

Slip
description comes...

horizontal Snake
description comes...

vertical Snake
description comes...

Funnel Hover
description comes...

Helicopter Manoeuvres 

Loop
 Inside loop.	A vertical circle commenced from horizontally and with level flight. A positive pitch is applied throughout the movement so the upper surfaces of the aircraft are pointing towards the center of the circle. The circle must remain perfectly round, with entry and exit to be at the same altitude.
 Outside loop.	A vertical circle commenced from horizontally and with level flight. A negative pitch is applied throughout the movement so the lower surfaces of the aircraft are pointing towards the center of the circle. The circle must remain perfectly round, with entry and exit to be at the same altitude.

Pogo A hover that causes the helicopter to climb and descend.

Roll A 360 degree revolution around the longitudinal axis.

Snap Up
                    "Tic-toc"        "Funnel"

See also 
 3D Masters
 Radio-controlled aircraft
 Radio-controlled helicopter
 RC flight simulator
 Extra EA-300

References

Model aircraft